Muusoctopus levis is a species of octopus in the family Enteroctopodidae. The species is found in subantarctic waters in the Southern Ocean, particularly surrounding Heard Island and Kerguelen Island, but specimens comparable to M. levis have also been found at the Antarctic Peninsula.

Description

It is predatory, living and feeding in the benthic zone, where it feeds heavily on brittle stars. In a study in which the stomach contents of 70 specimens were examined, around 50 were shown to have fed only on brittle stars. A study on the reproductive strategies of coleoid cephalopods concluded, while "a simultaneous terminal spawning strategy is most likely" for M. levis, "the egg-length frequency graphs and multivariate analysis also suggest a greater variation in egg-lengths which could lead to spawning over an extended period". The study collected five female M. levis specimens from the Southern Ocean.

M. levis is similar in appearance to another species in the same genus, Muusoctopus rigbyae, which was first described in 2009 based on specimens found in Antarctic trawling surveys near the Antarctic Peninsula, and while similar in appearance, differs from M. levis in its arm length, the depth of its interdigital webbing, and specific details of its hectocotylus.

References

Octopuses
Fauna of the Southern Ocean
Molluscs described in 1885
Taxa named by William Evans Hoyle